People is the sixth full-length album by the Canadian indie rock band The Burning Hell, released in April 2013 in Canada, May 2013 in Europe and April 2014 in the UK. The album was recorded in Berlin by Norman Nitzsche and Ramin Bijan.

Track listing 
All tracks written by Mathias Kom and arranged by The Burning Hell.

 "Grown Ups"
 "Holidaymakers"
 "Amateur Rappers"
 "Realists"
 "Sentimentalists"
 "Barbarians"
 "Wallflowers"
 "Travel Writers"
 "Industrialists"

Personnel 

 Mathias Kom - ukulele, guitar, vocals, xylophone
 Darren Browne - guitar
 Nick Ferrio - bass, lap steel, vocals
 Jake Nicoll - drums, keys, vocals
 Ariel Sharratt - clarinet, vocals
 Stanley Brinks - saxophone, vocals
 Clemence Freschard - zafzafa, vocals

2013 albums
The Burning Hell albums